Karpoora Mullai is a 1991 Indian Tamil-language film directed by Fazil, starring Amala, Raja and Srividya. The bilingual film was simultaneously shot in Malayalam as Ente Sooryaputhrikku.

Plot 

Maya (Amala) was a spoiled child of a rich man as she always creates issues in her hostel as well as in college. One day along with her friends, she decides to make fun of a Dr. Srinivas (Raja), but the doctor in turn insults her saying that she is a fatherless child. Shocked Maya understands her childish behavior and attempts suicide, but the doctor saves her and she gets back to normal, but starts loving the doctor and she also decide to find out who her father is and finally she discovers that her father had adopted her when she was baby and her biological mother was K. S Vasundhara Devi (Srividya), famous singer. She tries her every bit to make her mom accept her. Finally her mother accepts Maya, but before she make this news to public, Vasundhara Devi is murdered by her administration employees for her wealth. Maya kills her mother's killer's and she is sentenced to lifetime imprisonment. Srinivas marries Maya while she serves her sentence.

Cast 
 Amala as Maya Vinodini
 Srividya as Vasundhara Devi K. S
 Sumithra as Dr. Srinivas's mother
 Raja as Dr. Srinivas
 TS. Raghavendra
 Prathapachandran as Shiva Prasad
 Vijayakumar as Vinod Shankar
 Bheeman Raghu as Ravi
 Suma Jayaram
 Kalady Omana
 Fazil as guest appearance
 Suresh Gopi as guest appearance
 Kanya Bharathi

Soundtrack 
The highly successful soundtrack was composed by Ilaiyaraaja and sung by K. J. Yesudas, Chitra, P. Susheela and P. Leela.

Reception 
N. Krishnaswamy of The Indian Express called it "Alternatively vibrant and serious [..] built up well by director Fazil [..]".

References

External links 
 

1990s Tamil-language films
1991 films
Films about adoption
Films directed by Fazil
Films scored by Ilaiyaraaja